"Grip Like a Vice" is a single from the album Proof of Youth by  The Go! Team. It was released on July 9, 2007 on Memphis Industries. It was released as a CD single and was also released on two limited edition coloured vinyl singles. It reached number 57 on the UK Singles Chart and ranked at number 58 on Rolling Stones list of the 100 Best Songs of 2007. This song was also included in the game FIFA Street 3.

Track listing
"Grip Like a Vice" CD single
 "Grip Like a Vice"
 "A Version of Myself"

"Grip Like a Vice" Vinyl 7" (S1)
 "Grip Like a Vice"
 "Bull in the Heather"

"Grip Like a Vice" Vinyl 7" (S2)
 "Grip Like a Vice"
 "Grip Like a Vice (Black Affair Remix)"

References

External links
 The Go! Team Official Site
Grip Like a Vice at MusicBrainz
Grip Like a Vice audio stream

2007 singles
The Go! Team songs
2007 songs